Body Language is a 2011 Dutch romance-dance film. Filming started in January 2011 and completed in July 2011.

Set in New York City, the movie follows five different dancers from different dance crews who came on their own to New York for a dance competition, while their subsidy has been withdrawn, and these die-hard dancers come on their own to fulfill their dreams while juggling with no money and each other's different personalities.

Cast
 Floris Bosveld
 Ingrid Jansen
 Sigourney Korper
 Boris Schreurs
 Ruben Solognier
 Lorenzo van Velzen Bottazzi

External links 
 
 

2011 romantic drama films
2011 films
2010s romantic musical films
Dutch romantic drama films
2010s musical drama films
2010s teen romance films
2010s dance films
2011 directorial debut films
Films set in New York (state)
2010s hip hop films